Ott Sepp (born 29 June 1982) is an Estonian actor, comedian, singer, writer and television presenter.

Career
Born in Tallinn, Sepp graduated from the Estonian Academy of Music and Theatre in 2004 and began performing at the Estonian Drama Theatre in 2005. Since 2006 he has been a principal actor at the Vanemuine theater in Tartu. Sepp has had prominent roles in Estonian films such as Names in Marble (2002), Malev (2005) and Tulnukas (2006); the latter two of which also featured his frequent television partner Märt Avandi. The two men have worked together as co-hosts of Eesti otsib superstaari (English: Estonia is Searching for a Superstar, the Estonian version of Pop Idol) in 2008 and performed together on the comedic parody television program Tujurikkuja (2008 – 2016), as well as co-hosting Eesti laul in both 2010 and 2011. In 2016, Ott Sepp and Märt Avandi hosted the final of Eesti Laul in Saku Suurhall. Eesti laul is Estonia's televised competition to select the country's Eurovision entry and singer. 

Sepp has appeared in stage productions at the Vanemuine theatre based on the works of: Oskar Luts, Rudyard Kipling, Juhan Liiv, Emily Brontë, George Bernard Shaw, Ole Lund Kirkegaard, Edward Albee and William Shakespeare.

In 2021, Sepp took part in a number of videos titled Toidukool (Food School) promoting meat consumption on the website Lihafaktid (Meat Facts) for the European Livestock Voice, compiled by the Estonian Chamber of Agriculture and Commerce.

Films
Nimed marmortahvlil (English: Names in Marble) (2002) – Mugur 
Röövlirahnu Martin (2005) – Nitram 
Malev (English release title: Men at Arms) (2005) – Uru Tark 
Tulnukas ehk Valdise pääsemine 11 osas (2006)  – Märt 
2pic (2006) – Punn 
Mis iganes, Aleksander! (2006) – Friend  
Jan Uuspõld läheb Tartusse (English release title: 186 Kilometers) (2007) – Akselerant Ott
Taarka (2008)
Kormoranid ehk Nahkpükse ei pesta (2011) – himself, cameo 
Täitsa lõpp  (2011) –  Ristiga mees 
 Seenelkäik (English release title: Mushrooming) (2012) – Sibi 
 Sangarid (2017) – Hillbilly 
 Klassikokkutulek 3: Ristiisad (2019) – Märten 
 Johannes Pääsukese tõeline elu (2019) – Johannes Pääsuke
 Sipsik (2020) - Sipsik (voice)
 Kuulsuse narrid (2023) - Värdi

Television
Buratino tegutseb jälle (2003)
Eesti otsib superstaari (2008) – himself, presenter
Tujurikkuja (2008 – 2015) – various roles and scriptwriter
Kättemaksukontor (2009 – 2011, 2013, 2017, 2018) – Policeman Kaspar Tuvi
Eesti Laul 2010 (2010) – himself, presenter
Riigimehed (2010) – Turvamees
Eesti Laul 2011 (2011) – himself, presenter
Eesti Laul 2016 (2016) - himself, presenter
Eesti Laul 2018 (2018) - himself, presenter
Süü (2021) - Miko Kurm

Awards and recognition
Colleague of the Year (Vanemuine theatre) (2007)
Young Culture of the City of Tartu (2008)
The Oskar Luts Humor Prize (2011)

References

External links
 
Õhtuleht – Ott Sepp: 'Täiesti ükskõik, mis pilt minust kellegi jaoks jääb.' 17 March 2007. Retrieved 10 September 2011. (in Estonian)

Living people
1982 births
Estonian male television actors
Estonian male film actors
Estonian male stage actors
People from Tallinn
Male actors from Tallinn
Singers from Tallinn
21st-century Estonian male actors
Estonian Academy of Music and Theatre alumni